Rabbi Shlomo Wahrman (Hebrew: הרב שלמה הלוי וואהרמאן) was the Rosh HaYeshiva of the Hebrew Academy of Nassau County and a Torah scholar. He authored thirteen books and hundreds of articles on matters related to Jewish law, Talmudic analysis, and Jewish history.

Leipzig (1927–1939) 
Rabbi Shlomo Wahrman was born and raised in Leipzig, Germany. In 1939, at the age of twelve, he and his Polish-born parents and his siblings received American visas.

Rabbi Wahrman concluded his book, Lest We Forget: Growing up in Nazi Leipzig 1933-1939, with the following words:

All these events have delivered a powerful message to me. Any Jewish city anywhere could potentially suffer Leipzig’s fate, chas v’shalom. There is no safety and security for us in galus, even in a democracy. The German Weimar Republic was a democracy, yet it could not prevent the emergence of a Hitler. When the anti-Semites so decreed, Leipzig, a city of 18,000 Jews, became Judenrein.

Cincinnati (1940–1955) 
Soon after arriving in New York, Rabbi Wahrman's family moved to Cincinnati, Ohio, where he grew close to the legendary Rabbi Eliezer Silver zt"l, whom he considered his rebbi muvhak. Due to Rabbi Silver's insistence and encouragement, Rabbi Wahrman honed his writing skills and recorded his copious chidushei Torah.  In the short biography of Rabbi Silver that he published, he wrote: I remember at times he screamed at me for lack of understanding--however, even then I sensed his great love and concern for me and not the slightest hint of hatred. Rabbi Silver was a man whose very essence was giving to others--his ahavas yisroel (love for his fellow Jew) knew no bounds...he saw every Jew as an extension of himself.Rabbi Wahrman studied at several different yeshivas in the United States, including the Beth Medrash Govoha in Lakewood, New Jersey, which at the time was led by its founder, Rabbi Aharon Kotler.[Citation Required]

After marrying Sarah Malka Herskovitz, an orphaned refugee who arrived in the United States after surviving the Holocaust, Rabbi Wahrman also matriculated at Wayne State University in Detroit, Michigan, where he received a master's degree in education.[Citation Required]

New York (1955–2013) 
He later moved east and became a well recognized mechanech, educator, advisor, talmid chochom and mechaber seforim. He served as rosh yeshiva of Hebrew Academy of Nassau County (HANC) and authored over a dozen books.

The SHOA Foundation interviewed Rabbi and Mrs. Wahrman in 1997 about their experiences in Germany before, and during, WWII.

Books 
In addition to numerous articles printed under a pseudonym in various Torah journals, Rabbi Wahrman authored a series of in-depth analyses of Torah topics called She'eris Yosef. Each of his works received acclaim from leading Torah Scholars around the world, and their letters of approbation are printed at the beginning of each of his books.

 She'erit Yosef vol. 1 (New York, 1977)
 She'erit Yosef vol. 2 (New York, 1981)
 She'erit Yosef vol. 3 (New York, 1984)
 She'erit Yosef vol. 4 (New York, 1987)
 She'erit Yosef vol. 5 (New York, 1989)
 Lest We Forget: Growing Up in Nazi Leipzig, 1933-1939 (May 1991)
 Orot HaPesach (New York, 1992)
 Orot Yimei HaRachamamim (New York, 1994)
 Orot HaShabbat (New York, 1996)
 She'erit Yosef vol. 6 - Orot Chag HaSukkot (New York, 2000)
 Before the Storm : Memories of a Lost World (2002)
 She'erit Yosef vol. 7 (New York, 2005)
 Kol Avinoam (New York, 2011)

Torah journals 
For decades, Rabbi Wahrman was a regular contributor to Torah journals such as Ohr HaMizrach, HaMaor, HaPardes, and HaDarom.

Personal library 
Bookshelves were located on the first floor of Wahrman's house. No shelves were double booked, indicating that the books were always in constant use. He had a habit of writing his name on every book, all 1500 of them. The library lacked political or regional boundaries, such that one could find a Likutei Sichos of Rabbi Menachem Mendel Schneersohn, A Yabia Omer of Rabbi Ovadia Yosef and the Teshuvot of Rabbi Moshe Shternbuch of the Edah Charedit all on the same shelf. The bedrooms did not have books either, as each bedroom had floor to ceiling bookshelves. There was also a portrait of the Lubavitcher Rebbe, Rabbi Menachem Mendel Schneersohn, facing a row of books containing Vayoel Moshe of Rabbi Yoel Teitelbaum.

References

External links 
 Words of Appreciation by Rabbi Daniel Z. Feldman
 YUTorah Lecture
 Yeshiva World News Obituary
 Matzav.com Obituary

1926 births
2013 deaths
20th-century American male writers
American Orthodox rabbis
Jewish emigrants from Nazi Germany to the United States
Rabbis from New York (state)
Writers from Leipzig
20th-century American rabbis
21st-century American rabbis